Fezzan Road is an asphalt road in central Libya, running from Abu Qurayn near the coast to Sabha in the Sahara Desert.

History
Fezzan Road was constructed in the early 1960s. It was the largest road project in Libya since the Italian colonial Libyan Coastal Highway. It was probably the most important transportation project in Libya prior to the petroleum era. 

The importance of Fezzan Road was reduced after paving the Mizda–Brak Road in the 1980s.

References
Abdel Aziz Tarih Sharaf, "Jughrafia Libia", Munsha'at al Ma'arif, Alexandria, 2nd ed., 1971.
Mustapha Ben Halim, "Libia: Inbe'ath Omma.. wa Soqout Dawla", Manshurat al Jamal, Cologne, Germany, 2003.
"Al Atlas at Ta'limi …", 1984.

Roads in Libya
Tripolitania
Fezzan